The Ada Covered Bridge is a  span Brown truss covered bridge erected in 1867 in Ada, Michigan, United States. Carrying Bronson Street across the Thornapple River, it is located just south of where the Thornapple enters the Grand River, in turn just south of M-21. It is listed on the National Register of Historic Places.

Design 
The bridge uses the Brown truss system, consisting of diagonal compression beams and almost vertical tension members (slanting in at the top toward the center of the span), patented by Josiah Brown Jr. of Buffalo, New York, in 1857. A timber bearing Brown's name was discovered during repair work carried out in 1913.

As is typical for covered bridges, its gabled roof is covered with creosote shingles.

History 

The Michigan State Legislature authorised Ada Township to borrow up to $3,000 for building or maintaining bridges in the area. Construction of this bridge, also known as the "Bradfield Bridge" was carried out in 1867 by William Holmes.

Prior to construction of the upstream dam, the Thornapple River was prone to flooding. According to a historical marker posted at the bridge, "it is said that farmers used to drive wagons loaded with stones onto the bridge during high water to hold it to the foundation."

Repair work was carried out in 1913 to modify the trusses, and replace the timber abutments with reinforced concrete. The bridge was part of an important artery into the village of Ada until 1930, when the main highway was rerouted and a concrete bridge built further down the Thornapple River. At that time the bridge was closed to automobile traffic, reverting to pedestrian use only.

In 1941 the Kent County Road Commission and the Works Progress Administration made extensive restorations, re-roofing the bridge with new protective creosote shingles and replacing many of its decayed underlying supports with new beams. The Road Commission purchased a nearby barn to supply wood for replacement of badly deteriorated elements.

The bridge was listed with the Michigan State Register on May 9, 1969, and with the National Register on February 16, 1970. It was awarded a Michigan Historical Marker (site L0075) on August 28, 1974. It is one of four existing publicly owned covered bridges in Michigan.

In 1979 the roof collapsed due to heavy snow, and the bridge was restored using funds raised by private donations. Shortly after the repairs were finished, the bridge was completely destroyed by fire. The citizens again rallied, this time with the help of the Amway corporation, headquartered in Ada, and rebuilt it once again.

The bridge is now open only to pedestrian traffic and connects the Village of Ada on one side of the Thornapple River with a park on the other side. It is maintained by the Kent County Park system.

Images

See also 

 List of Michigan covered bridges
 List of Registered Historic Places in Kent County, Michigan

References

External links 

 Aerial view of the Ada Covered Bridge
 

Transportation buildings and structures in Kent County, Michigan
Bridges completed in 1867
Pedestrian bridges in Michigan
Covered bridges on the National Register of Historic Places in Michigan
Burned buildings and structures in the United States
Fires in Michigan
Works Progress Administration in Michigan
Former road bridges in the United States
Tourist attractions in Kent County, Michigan
1867 establishments in Michigan
National Register of Historic Places in Kent County, Michigan
Road bridges on the National Register of Historic Places in Michigan
Wooden bridges in Michigan